Ricardo Medina DeLeon (born November 4, 1971) is a former minor league baseball player and manager who currently coaches in the minors. He has also coached for Panama in multiple international events, including the 2009 World Baseball Classic. He is the brother of former major league baseball pitcher Rafael Medina.

Playing career
Medina was a corner infielder who played in the Chicago Cubs organization from 1989 to 1994. He began his professional career with the Wytheville Cubs in 1989, playing in 51 games and hitting .264 in 163 at-bats. In 1990, he played 41 games for the Geneva Cubs, hitting .222 in 90 at-bats. He split the 1991 season between Geneva and the Peoria Chiefs, hitting a combined .292 in 73 games.

He spent both 1992 and 1993 with Peoria. In the former season, he hit .263 with five home runs and five stolen bases in 457 at-bats. He also had 60 walks and only 58 strikeouts. In the latter season, he hit .254 with no stolen bases, although he attempted to steal five times. That year, he had 40 walks and only 37 strikeouts. He played his final season in 1994 with the Daytona Cubs, hitting .226 in 54 games.

Overall, Medina hit .261 in his six year minor league career. In 432 games, he had 17 home runs and 71 doubles.

Minor league managing and coaching career
In 2007, Medina managed the AZL Cubs to a 27-29 record, which placed them sixth in the league. After a stint as the assistant coach of the Tennessee Smokies, Medina became hitting coach of the South Bend Cubs in early 2018.

International competition coaching
Medina coached for Panama in the 2007 Baseball World Cup and in the 2009 World Baseball Classic.

References

Living people
1971 births
Minor league baseball managers
Wytheville Cubs players
Geneva Cubs players
Peoria Chiefs players
Daytona Cubs players
Minor league baseball coaches
Sportspeople from Panama City
Panamanian baseball players
Panamanian expatriate baseball players in the United States